Sar Howzak (also Romanized as Sar Ḩowẕak) is a village in Pain Velayat Rural District, in the Central District of Kashmar County, Razavi Khorasan Province, Iran. At the 2006 census, its population was 1,567, in 435 families.

References 

Populated places in Kashmar County